Professor Dawar Khan Daud (16 February 1940  3 June 2018) was an English professor, Pashtu folklorist, writer, poet, researcher, lecturer, member of Pashto Adabi Board (PAB) and president of Rahman Baba Adabi Jirga (RAJ), a literary organisation of Khyber Pakhtunkhwa. In 2004, the president of Pakistan Pervez Musharraf awarded him Pride of Performance award in the field of art and literature.

He was born in Landi Arbab village of Peshawar. He graduated from Govt collage peshawar and later did master's degree in Pashto, Urdu and English literature from the University of Peshawar.

Literary career 
As a lecturer, Dawar was associated with the teaching profession at the various colleges of khyber pakhtunkhwa where he used to taught English literature.He wrote about seventeen research books on Pashto folklore, besides working on Pashto literature, idioms, dictionary, riddles, proverbs, riddles, grammar and poetry. He was also actively engaged in writing articles on Urdu and Pashto literature published in Pashto and Urdu newspapers and literary magazines, including Tatara, a monthly Pashto language newspaper of that time. After he retired from the educational service, he then joined literary organizations such as Pashto Adabi Board (PAB) and Rahman Baba Adabi Jirga (RAJ).

His prominent work included Pashto Tapa’, Taleem Auo Shairy, Rahman Baba Juand, Hamza Baba Aik Mutala, and Pashto Folklore Ke Arr. Some of his work, including a volume of his poetry and research thesis remained unpublished. One of his books A brief history of Pashto literature written in English language remained also unpublished. One of his publications Pashto Tapa, comprising different genres of folk poetry were introduced to curriculum of various universities in the country. He also wrote a 162 pages dictionary titled Sailab which comprises Pashto phrases and idioms. Most of his books are included in the syllabus of MA,PhD and CSS exams.His majority of books were given awards.

Published articles and poems in magazines (Urdu, Phusto and English) and other work: 

 The monthly "Rikbar"	Peshawar
 The "Laar"	Peshawar
 The monthly "Guncha"	Peshawar
 The monthly "Leckwal"	Peshawar
 The monthly "Amail"	Peshawar
 The monthly "Abasin"	Karachi & Peshawar
 The Quarterly"Tatara"	Pukhto Adabi Board Peshawar
 The Quarterly "Pukhto	Pushto Academy Peshawar University
 The Quarterly "Q	and " Mardan
 The Books raises	"Hujra" hy Karam Satter Yaquli Swati
 The Quarterly "Adaliat"	Pakistan Academy of Letters Islamabad
 Pakistani Literature "	Pakistan Academy of Letters Islamabad
 The Quarterly	"Paigham-i-Ashra" Islamabad
 The monthly	"Jamhoor-i-Islam" Peshawar
 The Quarterly	"Jarus"Karachi
 The Weekly newspaper	Khapalwak Peshawar
 The two monthly paroon	mardan- Published articles
 Maraka Mardan-	Published Articles
 Literacy Associations	Formed:
 Malgri "Shairan"	Landi Arbab Peshawar
 Pakhto Adali Tolana"	Landi Arbab Peshawar
 Adali Malgari "Landi	Arbab Peeshawar
 Pakistan Writer Guiled	Peshawar
 "Reman Adali	Jarga" Peshawar

Social Work:

 Chairman Local Zakat	Committee Landi Arbab Peshawar for one year
 In charge Lihzary	Masjid Rizwan, Landi Arbab Peshawar

Institutions served after Retirement:

 Research work on the	following for the production CD & DVD

 Khushal Khan Khattak
 Rehman Baba'
 Ghani Khan
 Humza Shinwari

Note: The Humza Shinwari CD & DVD production has completed so far, the remaining delayed due to non availability of Fana, any how the research on the above writers is available in book form with the Board.

 Pukhto Adabi Board	Peshawar on contract since 2005 to date

Assignments:

 Designation: Research	officer
 Compiling A dictionary	of Pashto Pashto Phrases & Idioms, entitled: Sailah one edition	comprising ت,	پ, ب,	 ا
 The second edition of	Sailah is in progress
 Member of the editorial	Board of Quarterly "Jatara"
 As a permanent writer	of the Quarterly "Jatara"
 Edition material of the	Quarterly Tatara.

 Assignments in:
 Board of Intermediate	and Secondary Education (BISE) Peshawar
 Despatch officer
 Member of the	Disciplinary committee
 Jurist scrutinizer
 As Judge of the books	(Prose & Verse) offered to the annual competition for Awards
 Abasen Arts Council	Peshawar
 Pakistan Academy of	Letters (PAL) Islamabad
 National Bank of	Pakistan
 Pakistan Writers Guild	Peshawar
 As Biography	Writer/Character Sketch Writer:
 Preshan Khattak
 Sahibzada Faizi
 Abdul Maleed Afridi
 Dr. Aqbal Naseem	Khattak
 Ghazi Sial
 Younus Khalil
 Hamaish Khalil
 Sakir Hussian Imdad
 Ziatoon Bano
 Dr. Syed Zaffar Ullah	Bukhari
 Khalil-ur-Rehman Khalil
 Nawaz Tair
 Sardar Khan Fana
 Raza Mohammad
 Dad Muhammad
 Syed Tahir Bukhari
 Syed Masoom Shah Masoon
 Ikram Ullah Bran
 Feroz Afridi

Engagement with:

 Electronic	Media-Radio (PBC) Engagement- since 1971
 Books reviewed - 36	(Prose & Versa)
 Writer of Articles	on Literacy Topics
 Participated in	Muskaiza
 Participated in	discussion programmes on literacy topics
 Feature writer	Rehman Baba, Khushal Khan Khattack, Ahmed Shah Afridi
 A series on Pashto	Tappa Broadcast 23 articles on different aspects so far- 17 articles	on the said topics remains
 Translation from	Phusto in English

 Malala Yousaf Zai
 Nuwar pa Chinaroona-	A drama by Nisar Muhammad Khan

 A series of	Pashtoon's heroes & scholars
 Stories & Drama	for children programme
 Script writing for	the PBE
 A series of

 Black ground of	Pashto Proverbs
 Absent social	reforms entitled "Che the la hall nawayay"

 Songs broadcast from	Radio by reputed singers- Iqbal's Ghazal translation in Pushto
 Diwa Radio voice of	America

Lectures on the various genses of Folkloza on line

 Pukhtun Khwa Radio:

 Discussion on Rehman	Baba (alive)
 Presenting views on	"Aaman"(alive)

 FM Radio Waziristan:

Lectures on literacy topics (on line)

 FM Radio Khyber

Lectures on literature, topics, recorded to compare in my office Pakhto Adabi Board Peshawar

 PTV Peshawar (Home &	National)

 Discussion	programmes on Pashto Literature
 Songs Telecast by	singers
 Script of songs	links for songs, to be sung by singers
 Lecture on "Sofizm"	Interweaved about my literary career

 PTV Peshawar outdoor	recording.

Death 
Dawar Khan was suffering from congestive heart disease and was subsequently admitted to the Lady Reading Hospital for medical treatment. He died of heart complications on 3 June 2018 (16th ramzan ul mubarak 1439) in Peshawar, Pakistan. He is buried in Landi Arbab village of Peshawar.

References

1940 births
2018 deaths
People from Peshawar
University of Peshawar alumni
English-language writers from Pakistan
Pashto-language writers
Urdu-language writers from Pakistan
20th-century Pakistani writers
20th-century Pakistani poets
Recipients of the Pride of Performance